Ossorio is a surname. Notable people with the surname include:

Alfonso A. Ossorio (1916–1990), Filipino American abstract expressionist artist
Amando de Ossorio (1918–2001), Spanish film director
Ángel Ossorio y Gallardo (1873-1946), Spanish lawyer and statesman
Aníbal González Álvarez-Ossorio (1876–1929), Spanish architect
Beatriz de Bobadilla y Ossorio (1462–1501), ruler of La Gomera
Constanza Ossorio (1595–1637), Spanish poet and writer
Filippo Alferio Ossorio (1634–1693), Italian Roman Catholic prelate
Peter G. Ossorio (1926–2007), American psychologist